Noric may refer to:

Noricum, an ancient region
Noric Alps
Noric language
Noric race
Noric steel
the Taurisci, also called Norici